Oregon Route 18 is a state highway that runs between the Oregon Coast, near Lincoln City, and Newberg.  OR 18 traverses the Salmon River Highway No. 39 of the Oregon state highway system, named after the river alongside its westernmost segments.

Route description

OR 18 begins (at its western terminus) at a junction with U.S. Route 101, a few miles north of Lincoln City near Otis Junction.  From there it winds eastward though the coast range along the Salmon River, past Rose Lodge and through a stand of timber known as the Van Duzer Corridor.  Emerging from the coast range, it enters the fringes of the Willamette Valley in the community of Grand Ronde.  It is briefly joined by Oregon Route 22 at a location known as Valley Junction, and overlaps OR 22 in a four-mile (6 km) stretch between Grand Ronde and Willamina, at which point OR 22 splits southeast towards Salem and OR 18 continues northeast towards the Portland area.  Also in Willamina, a business route veers to the north to serve the cities of Willamina and Sheridan; east of Sheridan the business route rejoins the mainline. This business loop was the former route and highway until 1957, when the current Oregon Route 18 was built as a bypass.

The highway continues northeast on a straight and level course through Willamette Valley farmland, including the community of Bellevue which intersects with Oregon Route 153, until it intersects with Oregon Route 99W just south of McMinnville.  In the McMinnville area, OR 99W serves as the primary business route (entering the downtown core) whereas OR 18 is a bypass route.  Two interchanges along OR 18 provide access to McMinnville, including Three-Mile Lane, a spur of the highway.  Oregon Route 18 provides direct access to the McMinnville Airport and the Evergreen Aviation Museum, home of the Spruce Goose.  East of McMinnville, Oregon Route 18 intersects Oregon Route 233, with which it overlaps until its eastern terminus, and Oregon Route 221; the latter near the city of Dayton. It then crosses over the Yamhill River to a second junction with OR 99W. OR 18 then follows OR 99W to Dundee, and follows the Newberg-Dundee bypass and terminates at a junction with OR 219. Typically, commuters continue north on OR 99W into the Portland area.

History

The highway is rather variant in its configuration.  For most of its length, the highway is a two-lane undivided highway, with intersections and cross traffic.  There are some limited-access stretches in the "bypass" sections (around the Willamina/Sheridan area, and near McMinnville and Dayton), and the occasional interchange in these stretches. This section was proposed by the Oregon State Highway Commission in 1955 as part of the adoption of new routes bypassing city centers.

In addition, there is a stretch between Willamina and Sheridan where the highway becomes a 4-lane divided expressway.

For several years, Route 18 has had a notorious reputation with Oregon motorists as an extremely unsafe highway with a relatively high number of fatal accidents. In 1995, the opening of two casinos in Grand Ronde and Lincoln City respectively, have greatly increased traffic on OR 18.

There are two completed expansions to the highway. One is a project which widened Oregon Route 18 to a four-lane expressway in the stretch between Grand Ronde and Willamina; an area where increased traffic (largely due to the casino) has caused significant delays. A later constructed overpass has closed down and blocked off a dangerous intersection.

The second project is a bypass around the Newberg-Dundee area intended to alleviate severe congestion that occurred along 99W. The Newberg-Dundee bypass is an expressway, numbered Oregon Route 18. Construction on the first  phase began in June 2013, and the section opened at 5am on January 6, 2018. This section connects Oregon 219 south of Newberg to 99W west of Dundee. The entire  bypass was expected to cost $262 million. It has four lanes and reconnects to 99W east of Newberg.

Major intersections

Special routes

Oregon Route 18 Business

Oregon Route 18 Business is a business route state highway in the U.S. state of Oregon that runs parallel to Oregon Route 18 between the Willamina, and Sheridan, in the Yamhill Valley.  OR 18B traverses the Willamina–Sheridan Highway No. 157 of the Oregon state highway system.  It is also known as the West Valley Highway.

Oregon 18B begins (at its western terminus) at a junction with Oregon Route 18 and Oregon Route 22, at Valley Junction near Willimina.  From there it travels eastward just north of the South Yamhill River. The river occasionally floods and closes the road. It passes through the community of Shipley, before entering Sheridan. OR 18B then reconnects to OR 18 at the eastern edge of Sheridan.

The business loop was the former main route and highway until 1957, when the current Oregon Route 18 was built as a bypass. The only traffic light on the road is in Sheridan at the intersection of 18B and Bridge Street where Sheridan Bridge crosses the South Yamhill River. In Sheridan the highway is Main Street. It is classified as a Rural Major Connector highway.

Business 18 averages approximately 5,900 vehicles per day at its eastern terminus and 6,000 near the western terminus in Willimina. Traffic averages around 5,400 vehicles per day between those two points.

Major intersections

References

External links
 Salmon River Highway Information
 ORoads: Oregon Route 18

018
Transportation in Tillamook County, Oregon
Transportation in Yamhill County, Oregon
Transportation in Polk County, Oregon
Transportation in Lincoln County, Oregon
Oregon Coast Range